Gregory Lamont Mixon is an American author and professor of history. He is the associate professor of history at the University of North Carolina Charlotte.

He received a Ph.D. from the University of Cincinnati in 1989.

His book The Atlanta Riot: Race, Class, and Violence in a New South City examined the 1906 Atlanta race riots. A review in the Georgia Historical Quarterly called it the definitive account of the riot. He also wrote about the African American militias in the Southeastern United States after the American Civil War.

Bibliography
Show Thyself a Man: Georgia State Troops, Colored, 1865-1905, University Press of Florida (2016)
The Atlanta Riot: Race, Class, and Violence in a New South City (2004)
The Atlanta Riot of 1906

References

University of North Carolina at Charlotte faculty
University of Cincinnati alumni
21st-century American historians
21st-century American male writers
African-American historians
Year of birth missing (living people)
Living people
American male non-fiction writers
21st-century African-American writers
African-American male writers